The anterior compartment of the forearm (or flexor compartment) contains the following muscles:

The muscles are largely involved with flexion and supination. The superficial muscles have their origin on the common flexor tendon. The ulnar nerve and artery are also contained within this compartment. The flexor digitorum superficialis lies in between the other four muscles of the superficial group and the three muscles of the deep group. This is why it is also classified as the intermediate group.

See also
 Compartment syndrome
 Posterior compartment of the forearm

References

External links
 
 Topographical Anatomy of the Upper Limb - Listed Alphabetically  University of Arkansas

Additional images

Muscles of the upper limb